Nelson Oyoo (born 26 June 1994) is a Kenyan rugby sevens player. Born in Molo, Nakuru County, he attended Molo Academy and later Njoro Boys' High School for his A-levels.  He competed in the men's tournament at the 2020 Summer Olympics. He was also selected for the Kenyan squad for the 2022 Rugby World Cup Sevens in Cape Town and is the captain for the kenyan side

References

External links
 

1994 births
Living people
Male rugby sevens players
Olympic rugby sevens players of Kenya
Rugby sevens players at the 2020 Summer Olympics
Place of birth missing (living people)